"My Old Yellow Car" is a song written by Thom Schuyler, and recorded by American country music artist Dan Seals. It was released in February 1985 as the third and final single from his album San Antone.  It peaked at #9 in early-1985.

It was also recorded by Lacy J. Dalton on her 1980 album Lacy J. Dalton, but her version was never released as a single.

Content
The narrator of the song nostalgically describes his/her first car, which was old and battered, but was the source of many fond memories. Although the narrator is now wealthy and riding in a chauffeur-driven luxury car, the narrator wishes he/she were still driving that old yellow car.

Chart positions

References

Songs about cars
1985 singles
1980 songs
Lacy J. Dalton songs
Dan Seals songs
Songs written by Thom Schuyler
Song recordings produced by Kyle Lehning
EMI Records singles